Sidney is an unincorporated community located in Comanche County in the U.S. state of Texas. According to the Handbook of Texas, the community had a population of 196 in 2000.

History
The area in what is now known as Sidney today was first settled as early as 1870. The two first settlers in the community were William Yarbrough and JA Wright. It was also named Jimmie's Creek (for a stream nearby) and Round Mountain. The community got its name from John Stapp's son, who served as the postmaster when its post office opened in 1886. In 1883, a store managed by Tom Davis was established. It grew to four stores in 1940 and gained three churches. Its population was 200 during that time. Its population went down by only four residents and remained at 196 through 2000. The community lost a store in 1980. The community's population went down to 148 in 2010.

Although Sidney is unincorporated, it has a post office, with the ZIP Code of 76474.

Geography

Education
The community's first school was founded in 1877. W.D. Cox was the teacher there. It continued to operate in 1940. The Sidney Independent School District serves area students.

References

Unincorporated communities in Texas
Unincorporated communities in Comanche County, Texas